Kirill "Kirka" Babitzin (22 September 1950 – 31 January 2007) was one of the most commercially successful Finnish musicians. His career spanned from the late 1960s until his death in 2007.

Previously associated with Ilkka Lipsanen's The Islanders band, Kirka went on to record a wide array of rock and pop music. Some of his most famous songs include Hetki Lyö (Beat the Clock), Leijat (Kites) and Varrella virran (Down by the River). His 1988 album Surun Pyyhit Silmistäni (The Sadness in Your Eyes) went on to be one of the best sold records in Finnish history. He also represented Finland in the 1984 Eurovision Song Contest.

Early life
Kirill Babitzin was born in Helsinki in 1950 to a Russian family. His father, Leon Babitzin was from St. Petersburg and fled to Finland in the aftermath of the October Revolution. His mother, Elizaveta Babitzin (née Zarubina) was partially of German-Russian descent and was born in Lappeenranta. He first got into music at the age of five when his grandmother gave him an accordion. He won an accordion competition at the age of ten.

Musical career 

His first band was The Creatures, which he joined in 1964 assuming stage name Kirka.

Kirka began attaining fame  when he joined the band The Islanders in 1967. Originally led by Ilkka "Danny" Lipsanen, the band became hugely popular. Kirka also recorded with Blues Section. Kirka used his fame to launch into a solo career soon-after. Kirka cited his 1960's breakthrough Hetki lyö (orig. Beat The Clock composed by Gottehrer-Stroll, a 1968 Elfstone B side) with The Islanders as his greatest achievement. Despite his initial success in the late 1960s and early 1970s, Kirka suffered from money-troubles through the late 1970s.

Kirka represented Finland in Eurovision Song Contest 1984, finishing a strong ninth with the song Hengaillaan. Four years later, he got his greatest chart success with Surun pyyhit silmistäin, a melancholic pop-schlager. True to his rock'n'roll roots, however, he never fully appreciated this success, repeatedly

Babitzin was awarded the Emma award for best male singer twice, first in 1984 and then in 2000. He died suddenly on 31 January 2007 at his home of undisclosed acute illness. His widow Paula Nummela is a jewellery designer.

Family
Several Babitzin siblings are established musicians in their own right. In 1978, Kirka released a duet album with sister Anna; the next year, another sister Marija ("Muska") joined in.

Kirka's brother was popular rock musician Sammy Babitzin, who was killed in a car crash in 1973. Sammy's signature hit Daada daada tells a story of high-speed automotive cruising.

Discography
Kirka Babitzin released 78 singles and almost 60 albums, including 15 collections. Kirka's album Surun pyyhit silmistäni (1988) became the biggest selling album in Finnish history; it has now been relegated to all-time third place.

Albums
 Kirka keikalla (1969)
 Kirka (1969)
 Saat kaiken (1971)
 Nykyaikaa (1972)
 Rautaa ja kettinkiä  (1973)
 Kirkan parhaita (1974)
 Tiukka linja (1975)
 Babitzinit konsertissa  (1975)
 Lauantaiyö (1976)
 Kaksi puolta (1977)
 Anna & Kirka (1978)
 Kirkan parhaat (1979)
 Kirka (1981)
 Täytyy uskaltaa (1983)
 Hengaillaan	(gold, 1984)
 Älä sano ei (1985)
 Isot hitit (1985)
 R.O.C.K. (gold, 1986)
 The Spell (gold, 1987)
 Surun pyyhit silmistäni (quadruple platinum, 1988)
 Anna käsi (double platinum, 1989)
 Iskelmäkansio  (1989)
 Parhaat, uudet versiot (1990)
 Ota lähellesi (double platinum, 1990)
 Kasvot peilissä (platinum, 1991)
 Babitzin  (1991)
 Pyydä vain (gold, 1992)
 Kirka (gold, 1994)
 Sadness in your Eyes (1995)
 Tie huomiseen (gold, 1996)
 Hetki lyö: 1967–1997 (platinum, 1997)
 Mestarit Areenalla (triple platinum, 1999)
 Suuri hetki (2000)
 Sinut siinä nään (2002)
 Elämääni eksynyt (2005)
 40 unohtumatonta laulua (2006)
 The Best of Kirka (2007)

See also
List of best-selling music artists in Finland

References
 Official Website
 Kirka Babitzin at Populaarimusiikin museo (in Finnish)
 The list of all-time top records by sold units in Finland (in Finnish)

1950 births
2007 deaths
Musicians from Helsinki
Eurovision Song Contest entrants for Finland
Eurovision Song Contest entrants of 1984
Russian-speaking Finns
Finnish people of Russian descent
Finnish people of German-Russian descent
Finnish pop singers
20th-century Finnish male singers
Finnish rock musicians
English-language singers from Finland